Nong Bua is a tambon (subdistrict) of Chai Prakan District, in Chiang Mai Province, Thailand. In 2020 it had a total population of 16,861 people.

History
The subdistrict was created effective September 1, 1985 by splitting off 8 administrative villages from Pong Tam.

Administration

Central administration
The tambon is subdivided into 11 administrative villages (muban).

Local administration
The area of the subdistrict is shared by 2 local governments.
the subdistrict municipality (Thesaban Tambon) Chai Prakan (เทศบาลตำบลไชยปราการ)
the subdistrict municipality (Thesaban Tambon) Nong Bua (เทศบาลตำบลหนองบัว)

References

External links
Thaitambon.com on Nong Bua

Tambon of Chiang Mai province
Populated places in Chiang Mai province